Avogadro is an Italian surname, derived from avogaro, a Venetian term for a diocese official  (equivalent to avvocato, advocatus, "advocate"). In 1389, bishop   Nicolò Beruti, made the office of avogaro hereditary, and a number of noble families with the name Avogaro or Avogadro developed over the following centuries, in Brescia, Vercelli and Treviso.

 Albert Avogadro (d. 1214), canon lawyer and Latin Patriarch of Jerusalem
 Amedeo Avogadro (1776–1856), chemist. Named after him are:
 Avogadro constant 
 Avogadro's law, an ideal gas law
 Avogadro project, a project to base the standard kilogram mass on the Avogadro constant, rather than an arbitrary block of metal
 Avogadro (crater), lunar crater
 Avogadro (software), molecular editor
 Lucia Albani Avogadro (1534-1568), poetess
 Oscar Avogadro (1951–2010), lyricist